This is a list of the first minority male lawyer(s) and judge(s) in Nevada. It includes the year in which the men were admitted to practice law (in parentheses). Also included are men who achieved other distinctions, such becoming the first in their state to graduate from law school or become a political figure.

Firsts in Nevada's history

Lawyers 

First Hispanic American male: John F. Mendoza (1951) 
 First African American males: Earle W. White Jr. and Robert L. Reid (1964)

State judges 

 First Hispanic American male (justice of the peace): John F. Mendoza (1951) from 1955-1957
 First African American male: Robert L. Reid (1964) in 1966 
 First Hispanic American male (district court): John F. Mendoza (1951) in 1966  
 First African American (district court): Addeliar Dell Guy (1957) in 1975  
 First African American male (Nevada Supreme Court): Michael L. Douglas (1974) in 2004   
 First Asian American male: Jerome "Jerry" Tao (1992) in 2011  
 First African American male (Chief Justice; Nevada Supreme Court): Michael L. Douglas (1974) in 2011

Federal judges 
First Hispanic American male: Brian Sandoval (1989) from 2005-2009

Attorney General of Nevada 

 First Hispanic American male: Brian Sandoval (1989) from 2003-2005 
First African American male: Aaron D. Ford in 2019

Deputy Attorney General 

 First Latino American male: Vincent Ochoa in 1982

United States Attorney 

 First African American male: Jason Frierson in 2022

Deputy District Attorney 

 First Hispanic American male: John F. Mendoza (1951) from 1951-1955 
 First African American male: Addeliar Dell Guy (1957) in 1966

Nevada State Bar Association 

 First African American male (pass Nevada bar exam): Charles Kellar (1961)  
 First African American male (president): Bryan K. Scott (1991) from 2016-2017

Firsts in local history 
 Addeliar Dell Guy (1957): First African American male to serve as a Deputy District Attorney in Clark County, Nevada (1966) and Judge of the Eighth Judicial District Court, Dept. XI (1975)
John F. Mendoza (1951): First Hispanic American male to serve as a Justice of the Peace (1955-1957) for the Las Vegas Township, City Attorney for North Las Vegas (1958-1959) and District Attorney (1960) for Clark County, Nevada
Bryan K. Scott (1991): First African American male to serve as the President of the Clark County Bar Association, Nevada
Fidel Salcedo: First Latino American male to serve as a Justice of the Peace in Reno, Nevada [Washoe County, Nevada]
 David Dean (1974): First African American male lawyer in Reno, Nevada [Washoe County, Nevada]
 Kenneth R. Howard: First African American male to serve as a Judge of the Reno Municipal Court (1999) [Washoe County, Nevada]

See also 

 List of first minority male lawyers and judges in the United States

Other topics of interest 

 List of first women lawyers and judges in the United States
 List of first women lawyers and judges in Nevada

References 

 
Minority, Nevada, first
Minority, Nevada, first
Legal history of Nevada
Lists of people from Nevada
Nevada lawyers